Buzbee is a surname. Notable people with the surname include:

Alex Buzbee (born 1985), American football player
Kenneth Buzbee (born 1937), American politician and businessman
Lewis Buzbee (born 1957), American author and poet
Minnie A. Buzbee (1880–1955), American advertising executive
Sally Buzbee (born 1965), American journalist
Tony Buzbee (born 1968), American lawyer and politician